Birkenhead Wanderers was a semi-professional rugby league club in Birkenhead, England. They became members of the Northern Rugby Football Union and played for three full seasons from 1901–02 to 1903–04

History

Early days 
Birkenhead Wanderers FC was formed as a rugby union club some time before 1895.

During the early years (during the period playing under RFU rules), the club had a prominent player who gained international caps. Samuel "Sam" Houghton, while playing for Birkenhead Wanderers, was picked to play for England in the first of the 1896 Home Nations Championship games on 4 January 1896 and was then picked to play in the second match of the tournament on 1 February. By this time he had re-signed for his old club Runcorn, who had now changed codes to Northern Union.

Northern Union 
Sometime after the Schism, Birkenhead Wanderers decided to change codes and joined the Northern Union.

They entered the Challenge Cup Competition in 1900–01 and lost 2–10 at home to Widnes on 23 March 1901 in the 3rd round.

They joined the ranks of the semi-professionals when they became members of the Northern Union in 1901–02 and played for one season in the Lancashire Senior Competition, which was effectively Division 2 (West). Although they were from Cheshire, they, like several other Cheshire clubs and some Cumberland clubs, participated in the Lancashire Competitions. The club managed a mid-table position of 7th out of 13 clubs.

At the end of the 1901–02 season, the County Leagues elected 18 teams to join the new Division 2 (7 from Lancashire and 10 from Yorkshire and new member South Shields) with the existing second competition scrapped. This meant that teams were excluded from the senior competitions.

In season 1902–03 Birkenhead Wanderers joined the new 2nd Division, where they would stay for the remainder of their professional existence. The club again managed a mid-table position of 9th out of 18 clubs.

Before the start of their third and final season 1903–04 the club dropped the "Wanderers" suffix, becoming plain Birkenhead. They ended the season in 14th position out of the 17 clubs.

The following season, 1904–05 Birkenhead started off, lost their first four matches failing to score even one solitary point, and resigned from the league. No further history is known for the club.

They are mentioned again in a conflicting report about Prenton (the district) that states – "The Tranmere Rovers came to the Prenton Park Stadium in 1912, after taking the grounds back from the Birkenhead Wanderers Rugby League to whom they had leased it in 1902"

Stadium 

Tranmere Rovers was founded in 1884 and played the first games at Steele's Field. This was just a field with no facilities, named after the landlord of the adjacent Beekeepers' pub.
At the end of the 1886/87 season, Tranmere Rovers bought Ravenshaw's Field next door to Tranmere Rugby Club, and relocated. The new ground was quickly enclosed so that gate money could be taken and later improvements included dressing rooms, a small stand and turnstiles. In 1895, what had previously been known as the "Borough-road enclosure" was renamed Prenton Park even though it was outside the Prenton area boundaries. It is on this ground that Birkenhead Wanderers played rugby.

In 1912 Prenton Park was sold off to make way for housing and Tranmere Rovers moved into their 3rd home taking the Prenton Park name with them.

Club league record 
The league positions for Birkenhead Wanderers for the 3 years in which they played semi-professional rugby league are given in the following table:-

Heading Abbreviations
RL = Single division; Pl = Games played; W = Win; D = Draw; L = Lose; PF = Points for; PA = Points against; Diff = Points difference (+ or -); Pts = League points
% Pts = A percentage system was used to determine league positions due to clubs playing varying number of fixtures and against different opponents 
League points: for win = 2; for draw = 1; for loss = 0.

Several fixtures and results 
The following are just a few of Birkenhead Wanderers fixtures during the three seasons (and other times) in which they played semi-professional rugby league :-

Notes and comments 

1 – Folly Fields is the stadium used by Wigan at the time until 1901. They then became sub-tenants of Springfield Park See below – Note 3. 
2 – Lowerhouse Lane is the original site of the current ground used by Widnes. It was renamed Naughton Park in 1932 in honour of club secretary, Tom Naughton – and later renamed Halton Stadium after being completely rebuilt in 1997.
3 – Wigan became sub-tenants of Springfield Park, which they shared with Wigan United AFC, playing their first game there on 14 September 1901 at which a crowd of 4,000 saw them beat Morecambe 12–0, and the last game on 28 April 1902 when Wigan beat the Rest of Lancashire Senior Competition. A temporary ground was necessary to span the period between moving from Folly Fields and the new ground at Central Park being constructed.
4 – Prenton Park (or 'New' Prenton Park) is still the home of Tranmere Rovers F C.

See also 
Samuel "Sam" Houghton
List of defunct rugby league clubs
Prenton Park

References

External links 
UK Holiday Places – Prenton
The Beautiful History

Defunct rugby league teams in England
Sport in Birkenhead
Rugby clubs established in 1894
Rugby clubs disestablished in 1904
Rugby league teams in Merseyside